is the second single and first double A-side single by Japanese boy band Arashi. The single was released on April 5, 2000 in two editions. While both the regular edition and limited edition contains two songs and its instrumentals, only the limited edition was released in the shape of a flying disc and included a set of round stickers. It reached number one on the Oricon Singles Chart and was certified platinum by the Recording Industry Association of Japan for shipments of 400,000 copies.

Single information
"Sunrise Nippon" was covered by Eurobeat Lovers in Dancemania Presents JParadise and quoted in the drama Ikebukuro West Gate Park. Although both "Sunrise Nippon" and "Horizon" are A-side songs, only "Sunrise Nippon" has a music video.

Composition
"Sunrise Nippon" was written by F&T and Kōji Makaino, and arranged by Chokkaku. Musically, "Sunrise Nippon" is a pop song with a "groovy bass line" and "cheerful, funky melody". "Horizon" was written by Takeshi and Shin Tanimoto, and arranged by Hitoshi Munakata and Naoki Hayashibe. CD Journal described "Horizon" as an aggressive rock song with loud guitar.

Track listing

Charts and certifications

Charts

Sales and certifications

Release history

References

External links
 "Sunrise Nippon/Horizon" product information 
 "Sunrise Nippon/Horizon" Yahoo! Japan music profile 
 "Sunrise Nippon/Horizon" Karao single ranking profile 

Arashi songs
2000 singles
Oricon Weekly number-one singles
Pony Canyon singles
Songs written by Kōji Makaino